Amauri Morais Pereira (born 1 February 1982), known simply as Amauri, is a Brazilian footballer who played as a forward for America de Pedrinhas. In 2014 he had his only experience outside Brazil playing in Romania, first in Liga II, then in Liga I for ASA Târgu Mureș.

References

1982 births
Living people
Association football forwards
Campeonato Brasileiro Série D players
Liga I players
Liga II players
Centro de Futebol Zico players
Esporte Clube Bahia players
Fluminense de Feira Futebol Clube players
Associação Atlética Anapolina players
Brasília Futebol Clube players
ASA 2013 Târgu Mureș players
União Agrícola Barbarense Futebol Clube players
Brazilian expatriate footballers
Expatriate footballers in Romania
Brazilian expatriate sportspeople in Romania
Footballers from Rio de Janeiro (city)
Brazilian footballers